Pagiphora is a genus of cicadas in the family Cicadidae, found in the western Palearctic. There are about five described species in Pagiphora.

Pagiphora was formerly placed in the tribe Cicadettini, but is now the sole genus of the tribe Pagiphorini.

Species
These five species belong to the genus Pagiphora:
 Pagiphora annulata (Brullé, 1832)
 Pagiphora aschei Kartal, 1978
 Pagiphora hauptosa Boulard, 1981
 Pagiphora maghrebensis Boulard, 1981
 Pagiphora yanni Boulard, 1992

References

Further reading

 
 
 
 
 
 

Cicadettinae
Cicadidae genera